Charles L. Seymour Ellis (18 January 1875 – 31 December 1943) was a rugby union player who represented Australia.

Ellis, a lock and flanker, was born in Newcastle, New South Wales and claimed a total of four international rugby caps for Australia. His debut game was against Great Britain, at Sydney on 24 June 1899, the inaugural rugby Test match played by an Australian national representative side. His last Test was in Australia v Great Britain at Sydney, 12 August 1899. Due to funding constraints he was one of only six New South Wales players (with Bob McCowan, Hyram Marks, Lonnie Spragg, Peter Ward & Robert Challoner) selected to make the trip to Brisbane four weeks later for the second Test. His performance in that match was noted as excellent by the press.

Published references
 Collection (1995) Gordon Bray presents The Spirit of Rugby, Harper Collins Publishers Sydney
 Howell, Max (2005) Born to Lead - Wallaby Test Captains, Celebrity Books, Auckland NZ

Footnotes

Australian rugby union players
Australia international rugby union players
1875 births
1943 deaths
Rugby union flankers
Rugby union locks
Rugby union players from Newcastle, New South Wales